Robert Dowd (born 26 May 1988) is an English professional ice hockey player currently playing with UK Elite Ice Hockey League (EIHL) side Sheffield Steelers.

He also previously played in the HockeyAllsvenskan for IF Troja/Ljungby and Elite Ice Hockey League for the Sheffield Steelers and the Belfast Giants and is a three-time EIHL champion, twice with Sheffield in 2009 and 2011 and once with Belfast in 2012.  He was the top British points scorer in 2012 with 72 points and was named British Player of the team.  He is also a member of the Great Britain national ice hockey team.

On 22 April 2012, it was announced Dowd had signed with Swedish team IF Troja/Ljungby who play in the HockeyAllsvenskan, the country's second tier league.

In 2013, Dowd agreed a deal to return to former club Sheffield Steelers for the 2013–14 season.

In October 2020, following news that the 2020-21 Elite League season was indefinitely suspended due to ongoing coronavirus restrictions, Dowd and fellow Sheffield forward Marc-Olivier Vallerand agreed deals to sign for Italy2 side HC Eppan Pirates.

The move to Italy was a temporary switch, with Dowd agreeing a two-year contract extension with Sheffield until 2023 before the move was confirmed.

References

External links

1988 births
Living people
Belfast Giants players
English ice hockey forwards
HC Eppan Pirates players
IF Troja/Ljungby players
Sheffield Scimitars players
Sheffield Steelers players
British expatriate ice hockey people
English expatriate sportspeople in Italy
English expatriate sportspeople in Sweden
Expatriate ice hockey players in Sweden
Expatriate ice hockey players in Italy